Abrotanella caespitosa is a member of the daisy family and is an endemic species of the South Island of New Zealand.

References

caespitosa
Endemic flora of New Zealand
Flora of the South Island